Tommy Gallagher (born 17 August 1942) is an Irish Social Democratic and Labour Party (SDLP) politician who was a Member of the Northern Ireland Assembly (MLA) for Fermanagh and South Tyrone from 1998 to 2011.

Born in Ballyshannon, County Donegal, Gallagher attended Queen's University Belfast before becoming a teacher in Belleek, County Fermanagh.

Gallagher was elected to represent the Social Democratic and Labour Party in Fermanagh and South Tyrone on the Northern Ireland Forum in 1996, and held his seat on the Northern Ireland Assembly in 1998 and 2003 and 2007, however lost his seat in 2011.

Gallagher has stood unsuccessfully for the Westminster seat of Fermanagh and South Tyrone in each general election between 1992 and 2005.

His nephew Raymond played Gaelic football for the Fermanagh county team.

References

1942 births
Living people
Alumni of Queen's University Belfast
Social Democratic and Labour Party MLAs
Members of the Northern Ireland Forum
Northern Ireland MLAs 1998–2003
Northern Ireland MLAs 2003–2007
Northern Ireland MLAs 2007–2011
People from Ballyshannon
Politicians from County Donegal
People from Belleek, County Fermanagh